The 2009–10 Kansas Jayhawks men's basketball team represented the University of Kansas in the 2009–10 NCAA Division I men's basketball season, which was the Jayhawks' 112th basketball season. Their head coach was Bill Self, who was serving his 7th year. The team played its home games in Allen Fieldhouse in Lawrence, Kansas and are members of the Big 12 Conference. The Jayhawks finished the season 33–3, 15–1 in Big 12 play to capture the Big 12 regular season championship. They also won the 2010 Big 12 men's basketball tournament to earn the conference's automatic bid to the 2010 NCAA Division I men's basketball tournament. They earned the #1 overall seed in the entire tournament and were the 1 seed in the Midwest Region. They defeated 16 seed Lehigh in the first round and were upset by 9 seed Northern Iowa in the second round.

Pre-Season 
On April 13, 2009 key players Sherron Collins and Cole Aldrich announced that they would forgo the NBA draft and return for the 2009–10 season. The Jayhawks will return all players who saw significant minutes on last years Sweet 16 team. In early polls for the season, The Jayhawks were almost the consensus #1 ranked team for the 09–10 season, the only other team that was #1 in any other pre-season polls, was Michigan State, which defeated KU in the Sweet 16 of the 2009 NCAA tournament.

Departures 
In the offseason the Jayhawks lost Senior walk-ons Matt Kleinmann and Brennan Bechard from the 2008–09 roster. On April 9, Quintrell Thomas and Tyrone Appleton announced their intention to transfer to other schools due to lack of available playing time. Appleton averaged 0.8 points on 2.2 minutes per game in 2008–09 and Thomas averaged 1.5 points on 5.4 minutes.

Thomas announced that he will be joining the UNLV squad, however will not be eligible to play until the 2010–11 season.  Appleton transferred to Southwest Baptist University in Missouri.

Recruiting 
In October 2008, the Jayhawks received commitments from a pair of five-star recruits, Elijah Johnson from North Las Vegas and Thomas Robinson of Washington, D.C. On Thursday April 23, 2009 McDonald's All-American Xavier Henry of Oklahoma City announced his intention to play at Kansas, prompting ESPN to name the Jayhawks as "the team to beat in 2010." The Jayhawks will add center Jeff Withey, who transferred from the University of Arizona, and C.J. Henry who will transfer from the University of Memphis to join his brother Xavier. C.J. will walk on as his tuition is paid by the New York Yankees who took him in the 2005 MLB Draft. Withey will not be eligible to play until the end of the fall semester.

Class of 2009

|-
| colspan="7" style="padding-left:10px;" | Overall Recruiting Rankings:     Scout – 4     Rivals – 6       ESPN – 5 
|}

Transfers 

|-
|}

Accolades
Team:
Big 12 Preseason #1 (unanimous)
Blue Ribbon Yearbook preseason #1 team
Sporting News preseason #1.
Associated Press Preseason #1
ESPN/USAToday Preseason #1

Sherron Collins:
Big 12 Preseason Co-Player of the Year
John R. Wooden All-American and player of the year candidate
Blue Ribbon Yearbook preseason all-American team candidate
Associated Press preseason All-American

Cole Aldrich:
Big 12 Preseason Co-Player of the Year
John R. Wooden All-American and player of the year candidate
Blue Ribbon Yearbook preseason player of the year candidate.
Associated Press preseason All-American

Season summary

Highlights
Bill Self gained his 400th career victory with a 73–59 win over Iowa State on Feb. 13, 2010.
Bill Self gained his 100th win over a Big 12 opponent as coach of the Jayhawks with a 59–54 win over Texas A&M on Feb. 15, 2010. Self achieved the milestone in less than 7 seasons and in 121 games played.
Cole Aldrich broke Greg Ostertag's single season block record of 97. Aldrich had 98 as of Feb. 15, 2010.
Sherron Collins set the record for winningest Jayhawk in a four-year span with his 124th win, an 81–68 victory over Oklahoma on Feb. 22, 2010.  Breaking the previous record of 123 set by Raef LaFrentz, Billy Thomas and C.B. McGrath.
Kansas won their sixth consecutive Big 12 Championship, a feat that hadn't been accomplished in a BCS conference since John Wooden's UCLA teams of the 1960-70's.
Kansas claimed their 2,000th program victory on March 11, 2010 when they defeated Texas Tech in the Big 12 tournament.  They now rank 2nd in overall Division I wins, behind only Kentucky.
Bill Self scored his 200th win as Kansas head coach on March 12, 2010 when they defeated Texas A&M in the Big 12 tournament, the fastest to reach that mark in KU history.
The Jayhawks won the Big 12 tournament championship on March 13, by defeating Kansas State 72–64 and improving their record to 32–2.  The following day, they became the #1 overall seed in the NCAA Tournament.

Awards
Cole Aldrich
Consensus Second Team All-American
NABC Second Team All-American
USBWA Second Team All-American
AP Third Team All-American
ESPN and CoSIDA Academic All-American of the Year
Academic All-Big 12 First Team
Big 12 Defensive Player of the Year
All-Big 12 First Team
All-Big 12 Defensive Team
AP Big 12 First Team
USBWA All-District VI Team
Yahoo! Sports Third Team All-American
Foxsports.com Third Team All-American

Sherron Collins
Consensus First Team All-American
NABC First Team All-American
USBWA First Team All-American
AP Second Team All-American
Sporting News Second Team All-American
All-Big 12 First Team
AP Big 12 First Team
USBWA All-District VI Team
Yahoo! Sports Second Team All-American
Foxsports.com Second Team All-American
Frances Pomeroy Naismith Award
Lute Olson Award
NABC Senior Achievement Award

Xavier Henry
All-Big 12 Rookie Team
All-Big 12 Honorable Mention
Sporting News All-Freshman Team
USBWA All-District VI Team
Foxsports.com All-Freshman Team

Marcus Morris
All-Big 12 Second Team
AP Big 12 Honorable Mention
Yahoo! Sports Most Improved Player of the Year

Tyrel Reed
Academic All-Big 12 First Team

Roster

Schedule 

|-
!colspan=12| Exhibition

|-
!colspan=12| Regular season

|-
!colspan=12| Big 12 tournament

|-
!colspan=12| NCAA tournament

Rankings

See also
2010 NCAA Division I men's basketball tournament
2010 Big 12 men's basketball tournament
2009-10 NCAA Division I men's basketball season
2009-10 NCAA Division I men's basketball rankings

References 

Kansas Jayhawks men's basketball seasons
Kansas
Kansas
2009 in sports in Kansas
Jay